Hussein Jawad Al-Sadiq (born 15 October 1973) was a Saudi Arabian footballer in goalkeeper role.

He played on club level for Al-Qadisiya and Al-Ittihad. For Saudi Arabia, he was selected at 1994 FIFA World Cup, 1996 Summer Olympics and 1998 FIFA World Cup.

References

External links

Hussein Al-Sadiq at playmakerstats.com (English version of ogol.com.br)

1973 births
Living people
Saudi Arabian footballers
Saudi Arabia international footballers
Association football goalkeepers
1994 FIFA World Cup players
1995 King Fahd Cup players
Olympic footballers of Saudi Arabia
Saudi Arabian Shia Muslims
Footballers at the 1996 Summer Olympics
1996 AFC Asian Cup players
1997 FIFA Confederations Cup players
1998 FIFA World Cup players
1999 FIFA Confederations Cup players
AFC Asian Cup-winning players
Al-Noor FC players
Ittihad FC players
Al-Qadsiah FC players
People from Qatif
Saudi Professional League players